Silvan "Sämi" Thüler (1 August 1932 – 13 August 2011) was a Swiss footballer. He played as a defender.

Football career
Between 1950 and 1955 Thüler played for FC Solothurn. Solothurn won the Swiss 1. Liga (third national level) in 1952 and were promoted to the Nationalliga B. Between 1955 and 1962 he played for FC Basel in the Nationalliga A. During this time Thüler played a total of 216 games for Basel scoring a total of six goals. 148 of these games were in the Swiss Serie A, 13 in the Swiss Cup, six were in the International Football Cup  and 49 were friendly games. He scored four goal in the domestic league, the other two were scored in the Swiss Cup matches. From 1962 to 1963 Thüler played for FC Concordia Basel in the Swiss 1. Liga.

International career
"Sämi" Thüler played two games for the Swiss National team. His debut was on the 21 November 1956 in the 3:1 away win against Germany at the Waldstadion in Frankfurt.

Private life
Thüler married Lotti Feller in April 1956. They had two daughters, twins, Barbara and Silvia. First he worked for the local gas and waterboard. Later he was landlord and managed various restaurants, before he took over as manager of the Wenkenhof in Riehen.

Honours
Solothurn
 Swiss 1. Liga champions and promoted to Nationalliga B: 1952

References

1932 births
2011 deaths
Swiss men's footballers
Switzerland international footballers
FC Solothurn players
FC Basel players
FC Concordia Basel players
Swiss-German people
People from Solothurn
Association football defenders
Sportspeople from the canton of Solothurn